Starting Over is an American daytime reality television series that follows the lives of women who are experiencing difficulty in their lives and want to make changes, with the help of life coaches.  Six women at a time work to overcome obstacles and meet personal goals.  When it is determined that a woman has met all her goals, she "graduates" from the house and is replaced by a new roommate. On the other hand, if it is determined that she has not met her goals, she could be put on probation, or asked to leave.

History
The first season of Starting Over, in 2003-2004, was set in Chicago. The show used the voice-over narration of Sylvia Villagran. It featured life coaches Rhonda Britten and Rana Walker with a relocation to California and introduction of a consulting psychologist.

The second season saw the show moved to the Hollywood Hills of Los Angeles. Rana Walker was replaced by Iyanla Vanzant as the second life coach. Stan Katz joined the cast as the psychologist. During the second season, it was notable that in addition to the six women, for the first few months, there was also a baby in the mix. Josie, the holdover from the Chicago house, had given birth to a girl, Chloe, at season's end; and in that time in the Los Angeles house, she was included and doted on by the women, the life coaches and Dr. Katz. Josie was also unique, in that she was the only woman in the three-year history of Starting Over to have changed life coaches.  Since Rana, her original primary life coach, had been replaced by Iyanla and she already had three clients, she gained Rhonda, who had been her support life coach in the first season, as her primary life coach.

The third season was filmed in the Reseda district of Los Angeles. For the first three weeks of the third season, which aired from 2005 until 2006, couples worked together with the life coaches.  Although men have been guests of the women on the show, this was the first time that men appeared on the show specifically to work on their issues.

Starting Over was cancelled after three seasons, with the show airing its final rerun on September 8, 2006. Many of the stations airing Starting Over were offered a variety talk show hosted by former Will & Grace star Megan Mullally as a replacement by NBC Universal Television Distribution, which distributed both series. However, Mullally's show was a ratings flop and NBC Universal announced its immediate cancellation on January 4, 2007, with the final episode airing on January 9 after fourteen weeks on the air. NBCU quickly put together a package of Starting Over reruns, which were offered to stations to fill the gap left by the cancellation of The Megan Mullally Show, and launched them on January 26, 2007 to fill out the remainder of the season. Since 2013, Canadian Network One started airing the series.

Cast

Life coaches
Rhonda Britten (Seasons 1-3)
Rana Walker (Season 1)
Iyanla Vanzant (Seasons 2-3)

Consulting psychologist
Stan Katz (Seasons 2-3)

Narrator
Sylvia Villagran (Seasons 1-3)

Roommates

Season 1
Maureen Goodman (deceased): 1st graduate, and roommate during season 2, Roommate: Nyanza Davis, Esq. 
Nyanza L. Moore, Esq. (Nyanza Davis, Esq. at the time of the show), 1st African American roommate, 2nd graduate. Roommate: Maureen Goodman. 
Christine Carroll
Andy Paige: Season 1 graduate, Stylist 
Cassandra "Cassie" Romanelli
Lori
Kimberlyn
Candy Oxnam
Audrey Tucker
Teresa Crone
Brenda Starr Wilson
Hannah Buchanan
Karen Knoxcox
Christine H.
PJ Anbey: Season 1 and special appearances season 2
Erika Jackson
Rain Adams
Amy Harkin Goodrich: daughter of Iowa Senator Tom Harkin, and wife of NBA Basketball player Steve Goodrich
Susan Santa Cruz
Hailey Murray: niece of Starting Over co-creator/executive producer Jonathan Murray, and daughter of Starting Over graduate Lynnell
Lynnell Stage: mother of Starting Over graduate Hailey
Josie Harris: Seasons 1-2
Leah

Season 2
Sinae VanHaastert (Season 2)
Josie Harris (Season 1-2. Her goal was not completed when season 1 finished filming. She came back.)
Maureen Jacobs Goodman (Season 1 Graduate. Temporary Season 2 housemate)
Chloe (Josie's infant daughter. Season 1-2)
Deborah (Season 2)
Vanessa Atler (Season 2)
Bethany Marshall (Season 2 and appearances on Season 3)
Jennifer Lord (Season 2)
Megg Berry (Season 2)
Kim Bookout (Season 2)
Towanda Braxton Carter (Season 2)
Denise Lamberti
Katrinda "Candy" Oxnam
Cassie Mizer (Seasons 2-3) Season 2 graduate, and roommate during season 3
Sommer White (Seasons 2-3. Asked to leave in season 2. Given second chance in season 3)
Allison Stanley (Seasons 2-3. Had 2 goals)
Renee Panis 
Rachael West
Tess 
Layne
Karen

Season 3: Couples Bootcamp
Jaclyn Johnsen Romero
Michael Romero
Kacie Fann
Simon David
Cheryl Kohagen
Troy Kohagen
Jenn Marini
Lou Marini

Season 3 Housemates
Jessica Holland
T.J.
Jill Tracy
Christina Bounds
Allison Stanley (Season 2 graduate with a second goal to achieve during season 3)
Lisa Noonan
Christie Duran
Sommer White (Asked to leave during season 2. Given a second chance in season 3)
Kim Gildart Blodgett (deceased)
Lisa Castaneda Markano
Lisa A.
Niambi Janae Dennis
Jodi Isaacs
Antonia Andullerro

Guest coaches
Steve Rhode - Money, credit and debt coach (Season 1)
Sean Albrecht - Corporate telemarketing coach (Season 1)
Janae Whittaker - Life Coach- specializing in transition out of sport (Season 2)
Lisa Popeil - Singing voice coach (Season 2)

References

External links
 

2000s American reality television series
2003 American television series debuts
2006 American television series endings
Television series by Universal Television
Television series by Bunim/Murray Productions
First-run syndicated television programs in the United States
Television shows set in Chicago
Television shows set in Los Angeles